is a former Japanese football player and manager.

Playing career
Tanaka was born in Saitama Prefecture on June 10, 1971. After graduating from Tokyo University of Agriculture, he joined Kashiwa Reysol in 1994. In 1995, he played many matches as defensive midfielder with Takahiro Shimotaira. However he could not play at all in the match in 1996. In 1996, he moved to Japan Football League club Brummel Sendai. He retired end of 1997 season.

Coaching career
After retirement, Tanaka became a manager for Sagawa Express Tokyo (later Sagawa Shiga) in 2005. He managed the club in 2 seasons. In 2007, Sagawa Express Tokyo became new team; Sagawa Shiga merged with Sagawa Express Osaka. Then he became a coach for Sagawa Shiga. In 2008, he became a manager for the club. However the club results were bad and he was sacked in October.

Club statistics

References

External links

1971 births
Living people
Tokyo University of Agriculture alumni
Association football people from Saitama Prefecture
Japanese footballers
J1 League players
Japan Football League (1992–1998) players
Kashiwa Reysol players
Vegalta Sendai players
Japanese football managers
Association football defenders